Triona Holden is an author, artist, journalist, former BBC presenter and correspondent.

Holden began her career in 1976, aged 17, as a journalist at the Sheffield Star newspaper, eventually becoming their assistant crime reporter. Her first major story was Peter Sutcliffe, the Yorkshire Ripper.

She briefly worked as a broadcast journalist for Mercia Sound in Coventry, then a freelancer for LBC in London, before joining the BBC in 1982. She started on BBC Radio, before moving to television. Working as a news presenter and reporter, she covered the miners' strike of 1984-85. She was later to write Queen Coal: Women of the Miners, published in 2005, derived from her experiences covering the strike. She was the youngest female national news reporter and the youngest person to present the Today  and PM programme on BBC Radio 4; presented the Six O'Clock News on BBC 1;  Newsbeat on Radio 1 and World TV News. In 1987 she was the only reporter to broadcast live from the disaster scene after getting onto the wreck of the Herald of Free Enterprise when it became semi-submerged off Zeebrugge.

While at the BBC, in her role as a reporter, she travelled extensively to war zones, famines, conflicts, and other disasters, including the aftermath of the Tiananmen Square protests, the Brixton Riots, and the 1986 coup in Lesotho.

Holden retired from the BBC on medical grounds aged 39 after becoming seriously ill with Systemic Lupus Erythematosus. She later retrained as an artist.  From a Foundation Course in Fine Art & Design at The Camden Working Men's College 2006, she went on to Chelsea College of Fine Art and Design graduating in 2010 with BA (Hons) in Fine Art.  She is currently living and working in Whitstable.

Her book An Iron Girl in a Velvet Glove, a biography of Miss Joan Rhodes, will be published by The History Press was published on 18 November 2021.

She is currently a member of A is for Aphra (Behn) Society

Bibliography
Holden, Triona. Positive Options for Antiphospholipid Syndrome (APS): Self-Help and Treatment (2003) 
Holden, Triona & Hughes, Graham. Talking About Lupus: What to do and how to cope (2004) 
Holden, Triona. Queen Coal: Women of the Miners' Strike (2005)

References

British war correspondents
BBC people
Living people
Year of birth missing (living people)
British artists